Juan De Marchi (born Giovanni de Marchi in Turin, 10 June 1866 - 1943) – surname also spelled as Demarchi – was an Italian-born anarchist, best known for his friendship and influential role in the development of Salvador Allende's political identity.

In 1893, when he aged twenty-seven, De Marchi moved from Italy to Argentina, where he was involved with the Latin-American Anarchist movement that arose around the newspaper Umanità Nova, stoked by figures such as Pietro Gori and Errico Malatesta.

Later on he moved in Chile, where he worked as a shoemaker in Valparaíso.

When De Marchi was about sixty-three years old, Allende was attending high school at the Liceo Eduardo de la Barra in Valparaíso. It was at that time that the adolescent Allende came into contact with De Marchi's political and intellectual ideas. 
As Allende once said:

According to other interviewers, De Marchi had an important role in shaping Allende's ideology.

Sources 

http://www.elciudadano.cl/2011/09/20/41068/juan-demarchi-el-maestro-anarquista-de-allende/

Italian anarchists
1866 births
1943 deaths
Italian emigrants to Chile